China Factory is a Chinese cuisine restaurant chain based in South Korea and owned by the CJ Group. As of 2014, the chain had over 17 retail stores in South Korea.

The business closed its doors on May 21, 2017, however, China Factory Delight, a subsidiary, is still in business.

References

External links
 

South Korean brands
Restaurant chains in South Korea
Chinese restaurants outside China
CJ Group subsidiaries